Paroxya clavuliger, known generally as the olive-green swamp grasshopper or olive-green swamp locust, is a species of spur-throated grasshopper in the family Acrididae. It is found in North America.

References

Further reading

External links

 

Melanoplinae
Articles created by Qbugbot
Insects described in 1839